Stanley Elvey Reginald Aldous (10 February 1923 – 17 October 1995) was an English professional footballer who played as a defender for Leyton Orient in the Football League as well as for Headington United from 1958 to 1959.

Playing career
Stan Aldous was born in Northfleet, Kent, on 10 February 1923 and played for Erith & Belvedere, Bromley and Gravesend & Northfleet before joining Leyton Orient as a free agent in 1950. He went on to make over 300 League appearances for Orient and captained the club to the Third Division championship in 1956. He later joined Headington United, coached at Queens Park Rangers and managed Gravesend. Aldous died in Ely, Cambridgeshire, on 17 October 1995.

References

External links

1923 births
1995 deaths
People from Northfleet
English footballers
Association football defenders
Ebbsfleet United F.C. players
Leyton Orient F.C. players
Oxford United F.C. players
English Football League players